Luis Colón y Álvarez de Toledo, 1st Duke of Veragua, 1st Duke of la Vega, 1st Marquess of Jamaica (c. 1519/1520/1522  – 29 January 1572), was the first son of Diego Colón and María Álvarez de Toledo y Rojas, and grandson of Christopher Columbus.

After his father's death, a compromise was reached in the pleitos colombinos in 1536 in which he was named 3rd Admiral of the Indies and renounced all other rights for a perpetual annuity of 10,000 ducats, the island of Jamaica as a fief, the Dukedom of Veragua  estate of 25 square leagues in the Province of Veragua on the Isthmus of Panama, and the titles of 1st Duke of Veragua and 1st Marquess of Jamaica and 1st Duke of La Vega.

He married firstly in 1546 to María de Mosquera y Pasamonte, daughter of Juan de Mosquera and his wife Ofrasina de Pasamonte, and had: 
 María Colón de Toledo y Mosquera, a nun in Valladolid
 Felipa Colón de Toledo, 2nd Duchess of Veragua

He married secondly in Valladolid, on 19 October 1555, to Ana de Castro Osorio, daughter of Beatriz de Castro Osório, 6th Countess of Lemos and Sárria, and her second husband Alvaro Osorio, without issue.

See also
Pleitos colombinos

References

|-

|-

Luis
101
Colonial governors of Santo Domingo
Dukes of Spain
Marquesses of Spain
16th-century Dominican Republic people
16th-century Spanish nobility
16th-century births
1572 deaths
Colonial Panama
Colony of Santiago
Dominican Republic people of Spanish descent
Dominican Republic people of Italian descent
Dominican Republic people of Portuguese descent
People of the Spanish colonial Americas
16th-century South American people